Theophulis D. Lemon (born July 23, 1957) is an American football coach and former player.  He served as the head football coach at Central State University in 2005, and at Savannah State University from 2006 to 2007; he was also the interim head coach at Kentucky State University for the final three games of the 1984 season.

Biography

Playing career
Lemon was a four-year starter at defensive back at Ohio University.

Coaching career
His previous head coaching experiences include Kentucky State University (1984), the College of DuPage (2001–2004) Central State University (2003–2006) and Savannah State University (2006–2007).

He has served as an assistant coach at Kentucky State, Central State, Northeastern University, East Carolina University, Rutgers University and Wake Forest University.

Savannah State
Lemon entered his first season as head football coach at Savannah State University in 2006 moving from the head coaching position at Central State University. He was relieved of his duties on  after compiling a 3–18 record in his two seasons as head coach. Lemon was the 20th head football coach at Savannah State University. His annual salary at Savannah State was $65,000.

Head coaching record

College

Notes

References

1957 births
Living people
American football defensive backs
Central State Marauders football coaches
East Carolina Pirates football coaches
Florida A&M Rattlers football coaches
Kentucky State Thorobreds football coaches
Northeastern Huskies football coaches
Ohio Bobcats football coaches
Ohio Bobcats football players
Rutgers Scarlet Knights football coaches
Savannah State Tigers football coaches
Wake Forest Demon Deacons football coaches
Junior college football coaches in the United States
Sportspeople from Massillon, Ohio
Coaches of American football from Ohio
Players of American football from Ohio
African-American coaches of American football
African-American players of American football
20th-century African-American sportspeople
21st-century African-American sportspeople